Danger Street could refer to: 

Danger Street (1928 film), a 1928 American film directed by Ralph Ince
Danger Street (1947 film), a 1947 American film directed by Lew Landers
Danger Street, a comic book published by DC Comics under the DC Black Label